Friedrich August Johannes Loeffler (24 June 18529 April 1915) was a German bacteriologist at the University of Greifswald.

Biography
He obtained his M.D. degree from the University of Berlin in 1874. He worked with Robert Koch from 1879 to 1884 as an assistant in the Imperial Health Office in Berlin.  In 1884, he became staff physician at the Friedrich Wilhelm Institute in Berlin, and four years later became professor at the University of Greifswald.

His development of original methods of staining rendered an important and lasting service to bacteriology. Early in his career, he began a study of parasitic diseases. Among his discoveries was the organism causing diphtheria (Corynebacterium diphtheriae) and the cause of foot-and-mouth disease (Aphthovirus). His description of the diphtheria bacillus, published in 1884, was the originating cause of an antitoxin treatment. He also created Löffler's serum, a coagulated blood serum used for the detection of the bacteria. In 1887, he founded the Zentralblatt für Bakteriologie und Parasitik.

The Friedrich Loeffler Institute on the Isle of Riems near Greifswald, as well as the Friedrich Loeffler Institute of Medical Microbiology at the Greifswald Medical School of the University of Greifswald, have been named in his honor.

Notes

References

External links

 www.fli.bund.deGerman Federal Research Institute for Animal Health

1852 births
1915 deaths
German microbiologists
Academic staff of the University of Greifswald
People from Frankfurt (Oder)
People from the Province of Brandenburg
Diphtheria